Shamsabad (also Romanized as Shamsābād) is a city in Shamsabad Rural District, in the Central District of Dezful County, Khuzestan Province, Iran. At the 2006 census, its population was 2,934, in 708 families.

References 

Populated places in Dezful County
Cities in Khuzestan Province